The  was a limited-stop "Rapid" train service in Japan operated by the East Japan Railway Company (JR East) between  and  on the Banetsu West Line in Fukushima Prefecture.

Service pattern
Services consist of three trains in each direction daily. Some trains are extended to run to and from  during busy seasons.

Station stops
Services stop at the following stations. Not all services stop at Kikuta Station.

 -  -  -  -  -

Rolling stock
Services are normally formed of a 6-car 485 series limited express-type electric multiple unit (EMU) set number G55/58 based at Sendai Depot, sometimes substituted by a 6-car 583 series EMU (set N1/2). Prior to 25 February 2012, services were normally operated by Sendai-based 6-car 485 series set A1/2.

Formations
Trains are formed as shown below, with car 1 at the Kōriyama end. Cars 5 and 6 are reserved-seating cars.

485 series

583 series

History
In June 2011, the Sendai-based 6-car 485 series EMU set A1/2 normally used on Aizu Liner services was repainted from its previous "Akabē" livery into JNR beige and maroon, returning to service from 2 June 2011.

From 25 February 2012, set A1/2 was replaced by 6-car set 485 series set G55/58, a refurbished set, transferred from Oyama Depot and previously used on Nikkō and Kinugawa services.

Regular Aizu Liner services were discontinued from the start of the revised timetable introduced on 14 March 2015. Seasonal rapid services, named simply Aizu operate during busy holiday periods, which used six-car 485 series EMU trainsets until the timetable revision in March 2020, at which point the service began to be operated with E721 series EMUs equipped with a reserved seat section.

See also
 List of named passenger trains of Japan

References

External links

Named passenger trains of Japan
East Japan Railway Company
Rail transport in Fukushima Prefecture